Square Tavern, also known as the John West House, The Square, and Newtown Square Tavern, is a historic tavern located at Newtown Township, Pennsylvania. The original section was completed in 1742, and is a 2 1/2-story, rectangular gable roofed brick building, measuring 32 feet wide and 28 feet deep.  A small two-story kitchen addition was built sometime before 1798, and later replaced with a two-story wing. The wing was removed during the 1981 restoration, which returned the building to its 1742 appearance. 

The building serves as a museum and home to the Delaware County Tourist Bureau. It was added to the National Register of Historic Places in 1984.

References

External links

"Square Tavern" at Newtown Square Historical Society

1742 establishments in Pennsylvania
Buildings and structures in Delaware County, Pennsylvania
Commercial buildings on the National Register of Historic Places in Pennsylvania
Historic house museums in Pennsylvania
Houses completed in 1742
Museums in Delaware County, Pennsylvania
National Register of Historic Places in Delaware County, Pennsylvania